Kenji Satake is a Japanese seismologist who has made significant contributions to subduction and tsunami research. Along with Brian Atwater and David Yamaguchi, Satake assembled disparate pieces of information regarding a Japanese tsunami that had no known origin. The three scientists worked together to pinpoint a date, time, and location for the 1700 Cascadia earthquake – 9p.m. on January 26, 1700 – on the Cascadia Subduction Zone off the Pacific Northwest coast of North America.

References

External links
 Satake, Kenji – The University of Tokyo
 Profile – National Museum of Natural Science

Living people
Japanese seismologists
University of Tokyo alumni
Academic staff of the University of Tokyo
Year of birth missing (living people)